The 1901 New Jersey gubernatorial election was held on November 5, 1901. Republican nominee Franklin Murphy defeated Democratic nominee James M. Seymour with 50.88% of the vote.

General election

Candidates
Joel W. Brown (Prohibition)
Franklin Murphy, businessman and chair of the New Jersey Republican Party (Republican)
James M. Seymour, mayor of Newark (Democratic)
Charles H. Vail, pastor of the First Universalist Church in Jersey City (Socialist)
Frank W. Wilson (Socialist Labor)

Results

References

1901
1901 New Jersey elections
New Jersey
November 1901 events